Prabhu Deva is an Indian dance choreographer, film director, producer and actor, who has worked in Tamil, Telugu, Hindi, Malayalam and Kannada films. In a career spanning 25 years, he has performed and designed a wide range of dancing styles and has predominantly acted in Tamil films. He made his debut as a boy playing a flute in the song "Panivizhum Iravu", from the Tamil film Mouna Ragam (1986). After several appearances as a dancer, he made his debut as a lead actor in Pavithran's Indhu.  He made his career breakthrough in his second film Kadhalan (1994) directed by S. Shankar. Prabhu Deva acted as a college student who loves the daughter of state governor, who has ties with a terrorist. The film was a commercial success and critics lauded Prabhu Deva's choreography and the his dance sequences in the songs "Mukkabla" and "Urvasi Urvasi", became very popular.

Prabhu Deva featured in several commercially successful films like Minsara Kanavu (1997) and VIP (1997), where for the former he went on to win the National Film Award for Best Choreography for his work in the songs "Strawberry Kannae" and "Vennilave". He was critically acclaimed for his performance in the comedy Kaathala Kaathala (1998), co-starring with Kamal Haasan. Despite the successful ventures like Eazhaiyin Sirippil (2000) and Sundar C's Ullam Kollai Poguthae (2001), Deva was unable to recreate the success he had in his earlier years and many of his films didn't perform well financially.

In the year 2005, Prabhu Deva made his debut as a director in the Telugu film Nuvvostanante Nenoddantana. The film received critical acclaim and went on to become a blockbuster. The film was remade in seven languages and it is considered as the first Indian movie to do so. The movie won 9 Filmfare awards including a Best Choreographer award for Prabhudeva. Following the success of his directorial ventures, Deva started to prioritize directing to acting. Occasionally he starred as a lead in dance films like Style (2006), ABCD (2013) and its sequel ABCD 2 (2015).

Prabhu Deva established the production company Prabhu Deva Studios and produced the film Devi, which was directed by A. L. Vijay in the year 2016. The film marked the return of Deva to Tamil cinema as an actor after a 11-year hiatus. The film was acclaimed critically and was a financial success at the box office. After the success of the film, Deva appeared in Gulaebaghavali, silent film Mercury and Lakshmi in the year 2018. In the year 2019, Deva had a line up of sequel films including Charlie Chaplin 2, a sequel to Deva's Charlie Chaplin, and Devi 2. Both the films were met with negative reviews and failed commercially.

Filmography

Director

Producer

Performance roles

Actor

Dancer

Singer

Lyricist

References 

Indian filmographies
Male actor filmographies
Director filmographies